State Reasons is a 1978 French-Italian political drama film written and directed by André Cayatte.

Cast 

 Jean Yanne: Jean-Philippe Leroi
 Monica Vitti: Angela Ravelli
 Michel Bouquet: Francis Jobin
 François Périer: Prof. Marrot
 Jean-Claude Bouillon: Bernard Moulin
 Georges Chamarat: Gardener
 Jean Rougerie: Prime Minister
 Jess Hahn:  CIA Agent
 Hubert Gignoux: Minister of War
 Gabriel Jabbour: Meslam
 Michèle Lituac: Françoise

References

External links

1978 films
1970s political drama films
French political drama films
Italian political drama films
Films directed by André Cayatte
1978 drama films
1970s French films
1970s Italian films